The Corinth Excavations by the American School of Classical Studies at Athens began in 1896 and have continued with little interruption until today. Restricted by the modern village of Ancient Corinth, which directly overlies the ancient city, the main focus of School investigations has been on the area surrounding the mid-6th century B.C. Temple of Apollo.  This dominating monument has been one of the only features of the site visible since antiquity.  Archaeologists such as Bert Hodge Hill, Carl Blegen, William Dinsmoor, Sr., Oscar Broneer, and Rhys Carpenter worked to uncover much of the site before WWII.  Since then, under the leadership of directors Henry Robinson (1959-1965), Charles K. Williams II (1965-1997) and Guy D. R. Sanders (1997–present), excavation has clarified the archaeological history of the city.  Investigations have revealed remains extending from the Early Neolithic period (6500-5750 B.C.) through to early modern times.

Archaeological work has also been done outside the immediate area of the village center including at the Sanctuary of Demeter and Kore on the slopes of Acrocorinth, in the Potters’ Quarter, at the sites of the Sanctuary of Asklepios and the Kenchreian Gate Basilica. Current investigations focus on the area of the Panayia Field, located to the southeast of the Forum. School excavations and projects affiliated to the ASCSA have also intensively explored the wider area of the Corinthia including the surrounding settlements of Korakou, Kenchreai and Isthmia.  Finds from these works are housed in the Archaeological Museum of Ancient Corinth.

Footnotes

Further reading 

 H. N. Fowler and R. Stillwell, Corinth I: Introduction, Topography, Architecture, Cambridge, Massachusetts, 1932. 
 R. Stillwell, R. L. Scranton, and S. E. Freeman, Corinth I, ii: Architecture, Cambridge, Massachusetts, 1941.
 R. L. Scranton, Corinth I, iii: Monuments in the Lower Agora and North of the Archaic Temple, Princeton 1951.
 O. Broneer, Corinth I, iv: The South Stoa and Its Roman Successors, Princeton 1954. 
 S. S. Weinberg, Corinth I, v: The Southeast Building, The Twin Basilicas, The Mosaic House, Princeton 1960. 
 B. H. Hill, Corinth I, vi: The Springs: Peirene, Sacred Spring, Glauke, Princeton 1964. 
 R. Stillwell, Corinth II: The Theatre, Princeton 1952.
 C. W. Blegen, O. Broneer, R. Stillwell, and A. R. Bellinger, Corinth III, i: Acrocorinth: Excavations in 1926, Cambridge, Massachusetts, 1930. 
 R. Carpenter and A. Bon, Corinth III, ii: The Defenses of Acrocorinth and the Lower Town, Cambridge, Massachusetts, 1936.
 I. Thallon-Hill and L. S. King, Corinth IV, i: Decorated Architectural Terracottas, Cambridge, Massachusetts, 1929. 
 O. Broneer, Corinth IV, ii: Terracotta Lamps, Cambridge, Massachusetts, 1930. 
 T. L. Shear, Corinth V: The Roman Villa, Cambridge, Massachusetts, 1930.
 K. M. Edwards, Corinth VI: Coins, 1896-1929, Cambridge, Massachusetts, 1933. 
 S. S. Weinberg, Corinth VII, i: The Geometric and Orientalizing Pottery, Cambridge, Massachusetts, 1943. 
 D. A. Amyx and P. Lawrence, Corinth VII, ii: Archaic Corinthian Pottery and the Anaploga Well, Princeton 1975. 
 G. R. Edwards, Corinth VII, iii: Corinthian Hellenistic Pottery, Princeton 1975.
 S. Herbert, Corinth VII, iv: The Red-Figure Pottery, Princeton 1977.
 M. K. Risser, Corinth VII, v: Corinthian Conventionalizing Pottery, Princeton 2001. 
 B. D. Meritt, Corinth VIII, i: Greek Inscriptions, 1896-1927, Cambridge, Massachusetts, 1931. 
 A. B. West, Corinth VIII, ii: Latin Inscriptions, 1896-1926, Cambridge, Massachusetts, 1931. 
 J. H. Kent, Corinth VIII, iii: The Inscriptions, 1926-1950, Princeton 1966. 
 F. P. Johnson, Corinth IX: Sculpture, 1896-1923, Cambridge, Massachusetts, 1931. 
 M. C. Sturgeon, Corinth IX, ii: Sculpture: The Reliefs from the Theater, Princeton 1977.
 O. Broneer, Corinth X: The Odeum, Cambridge, Massachusetts, 1932. 
 C. H. Morgan, Corinth XI: The Byzantine Pottery, Cambridge, Massachusetts, 1942. 
 G. R. Davidson, Corinth XII: The Minor Objects, Princeton 1952. 
 C. W. Blegen, H. Palmer, and R. S. Young, Corinth XIII: The North Cemetery, Princeton 1964.
 C. A. Roebuck, Corinth XIV: The Asklepieion and Lerna, Princeton 1951. 
 A. N. Stillwell, Corinth XV, i: The Potters’ Quarter, Princeton 1948.
 A. N. Stillwell, Corinth XV, ii: The Potters' Quarter: The Terracottas, Princeton 1952. 
 A. N. Stillwell and J. L. Benson, Corinth XV, iii: The Potters’ Quarter: The Pottery, Princeton 1984. 
 R. L. Scranton, Corinth XVI: Mediaeval Architecture in the Central Area of Corinth, Princeton 1957. 
 J. C. Biers, Corinth XVII: The Great Bath on the Lechaion Road, Princeton 1985. 
 E. G. Pemberton, Corinth XVIII, i: The Sanctuary of Demeter and Kore: The Greek Pottery, Princeton 1989. 
 K. W. Slane, Corinth XVIII, ii: The Sanctuary of Demeter and Kore: The Roman Pottery and Lamps, Princeton 1990. 
 N. Bookidis and R. S. Stroud, Corinth XVIII, iii: The Sanctuary of Demeter and Kore: Topography and Architecture, Princeton 1997. 
 G. S. Merker, Corinth XVIII, iv: The Sanctuary of Demeter and Kore: Terracotta Figurines of the Classical, Hellenistic, and Roman Periods, Princeton 2000. 
 C. K. Williams and N. Bookidis, Corinth XX: The Centenary, Princeton 2003.
 see also Hesperia (journal) for numerous excavation reports and synthetic articles.

External links 
 American School of Classical Studies at Athens
 Corinth Excavations of the ASCSA
 ASCSA.net: Online archaeological databases of the Corinth Excavations
 GIS data and Maps for Corinth and Greece
 Corinthian Matters: a blog whose subject is Corinthian Archaeology

Archaeological expeditions
Ancient Corinth
American School of Classical Studies at Athens